Microsoft Tablet PC is a term coined by Microsoft for tablet computers conforming to a set of specifications announced in 2001 by Microsoft, for a pen-enabled personal computer, conforming to hardware specifications devised by Microsoft and running a licensed copy of Windows XP Tablet PC Edition operating system or a derivative thereof.

Hundreds of such tablet personal computers have come onto the market since then.

History
In 2003, original equipment manufacturers released the first tablet PCs designed to the Microsoft Tablet PC specification. This generation of Microsoft Tablet PCs were designed to run Windows XP Tablet PC Edition, the Tablet PC version of Windows XP. This version of Microsoft Windows superseded Microsoft's earlier pen computing operating environment, Windows for Pen Computing 2.0. After releasing Windows XP Tablet PC Edition, Microsoft designed the successive desktop computer versions of Windows, Windows Vista and Windows 7, to support pen computing intrinsically. The Tablet PC with Windows XP released in 2001 had 128 megabytes of RAM and a 600 megahertz processor, with a storage capacity of 10GB.

Following Windows for Pen Computing, Microsoft has been developing for tablets running Windows under the Microsoft Tablet PC name. According to a 2001 Microsoft definition of the term, "Microsoft Tablet PCs" are pen-based, fully functional x86 PCs with handwriting and voice recognition functionality. Tablet PCs use the same hardware as normal laptops but add support for pen input. For specialized support for pen input, Microsoft released Windows XP Tablet PC Edition. Today there is no tablet specific version of Windows but instead support is built into both Home and Business versions of Windows Vista and Windows 7. Tablets running Windows get the added functionality of using the touchscreen for mouse input, hand writing recognition, and gesture support. Following Tablet PC, Microsoft announced the UMPC initiative in 2006 which brought Windows tablets to a smaller, touch-centric configuration. This was relaunched in 2010 as Slate PC, to promote tablets running Windows 7 Slate PCs are expected to benefit from mobile hardware advances derived from the success of the netbooks.

Many tablet manufacturers are moving to the ARM architecture with lighter operating systems, Microsoft followed suit in 2012 with Surface and Windows RT. Though Microsoft has Windows RT for ARM support it has kept its target market for the smartphone industry with Windows Phone 8. Some manufacturers, however, still have shown prototypes of Windows CE-based tablets running a custom shell.

Recent developments of tablet computers with Windows featured Microsoft's Surface line, which ran the Windows RT operating system, and later Windows 8.1 and x86 and ARM versions of Windows 10.

Configurations

Booklet
Booklet PCs are dual screen tablet computers that fold like a book. Typical booklet PCs are equipped with multi-touch screens and pen writing recognition abilities. They are designed to be used as digital day planners, internet surfing devices, project planners, music players, and displays for video, live TV, and e-reading.

Slate
Slate computers, which resemble writing slates, are tablet computers without a dedicated keyboard. For text input, users rely on handwriting recognition via an active digitizer, touching an on-screen keyboard using fingertips or a stylus, or using an external keyboard that can usually be attached via a wireless or USB connection.

Tablet PCs typically incorporate small LCD screens and have been popular in vertical markets such as health care, education, hospitality and field work. Applications for field work often need a tablet PC that has rugged specifications that ensure long life by resisting heat, humidity, and drop/vibration damage. This added focus on mobility and/or ruggedness often leads to eliminating moving parts that could raise vulnerability.

Convertible

Also known as Netvertible; Convertible notebooks have a base body with an attached keyboard. They more closely resemble modern laptops, and are usually heavier and larger than slates.

Typically, the base of a convertible attaches to the display at one joint called a swivel hinge or rotating hinge. The joint allows the screen to rotate through 180° and fold down on top of the keyboard to provide a flat writing surface. This design, although the most common, creates a physical point of weakness on the notebook.

Some manufacturers have attempted to overcome these weak points. The Panasonic Toughbook CF-19, for example, is advertised as a more durable convertible notebook. One model by Acer (the TravelMate C210) has a sliding design in which the screen slides up from the slate-like position and locks into place to provide the laptop mode.

Convertibles are by far the most popular configuration of tablet PCs, because they still offer the keyboard and pointing device (usually a touchpad) of older notebooks, for users who do not use the touchscreen display as the primary input method.

Hybrid
Hybrids, coined by users of the HP/Compaq TC1000 and TC1100 series, share the features of the slate and convertible by using a detachable keyboard that operates similarly to a convertible when attached. Hybrids are not the same as slate models with detachable keyboards. Detachable keyboards for pure slate models do not rotate to allow the tablet to rest on it like a convertible.
An examples of hybrids are Microsoft Surface (10.6 or 12) or Fujitsu Stylistic (11.6 with an Intel-i5-vPro processor).

System software
Windows 7 touch capability is similar to Microsoft PixelSense technologies (formerly known as Microsoft Surface).  This is a gesture and touch-centric UI enhancement that works with most current touch computers.  Windows has a history of tablet technology including Windows XP Tablet PC Edition. Tablet PC Edition is a superset of Windows XP Professional, the difference being tablet functionality, including alternate text input (Tablet PC Input Panel) and basic drivers for support of tablet PC specific hardware. Requirements to install Tablet PC Edition include a tablet digitizer or touchscreen device, and hardware control buttons including a Ctrl-Alt-Delete shortcut button, scrolling buttons, and at least one user-configurable application button.

Service Pack 2 for Windows XP includes Tablet PC Edition 2005 and is a free upgrade. This version brought improved handwriting recognition and improved the Input Panel, allowing it to be used in almost every application. The Input Panel was also revised to extend speech recognition services (input and correction) to other applications.

With the succession of Windows Vista, the Tablet PC functionality no longer needed a separate edition. Tablet PC support is built into all editions of Windows Vista with the exception of Home Basic and Starter editions. This extends the handwriting recognition, ink collection, and additional input methods to any computer running Vista even if the input device is an external digitizer, a touch screen, or even a regular mouse. Vista also supports multi-touch functions and gestures (originally developed for the Microsoft PixelSense version of Vista) and is now usable by the public with the release of multi-touch tablets. Windows Vista also significantly improved handwriting recognition functionality with the introduction of a handwriting recognition personalization tool as well as an automatic handwriting learning tool.

Tablet functionality is available in all editions of Windows 7 except the Starter edition. It introduces a new Math Input Panel that recognizes handwritten math expressions and formulas, and integrates with other programs. Windows 7 also significantly improved pen input and handwriting recognition by becoming faster, more accurate, and supportive of more languages, including East Asian writing systems. Personalized custom dictionaries help with the recognition of specialized vocabulary (like medical and technical terms), and text prediction speeds up the input process to make note-taking faster. Multi-touch technology is also available on some Tablet PCs, enabling more advanced interaction using touch gestures with your fingers the same way a mouse is used. Despite such advances, problems may arise with tablet functions of the OS, when, for instance, touch screen drivers are recognized as PS/2 mouse input rather than a touch input device. In such instances tablet functions may be unavailable or severely restricted in functionality.

Windows applications

Applications developed for the tablet PC cater to the configuration and functionality available on the platform. Many forms of applications incorporate a pen-friendly user interface and/or the ability to hand write directly in the document or interface.

A brief description of the applications included follows:

Experience Pack
 Ink Desktop: an Active Desktop control designed to run in the background and allow the user to write directly on the desktop.
 Snipping Tool: a screen capture application which allows the tablet pen to be used to select a portion of the screen and then annotate it and save as a file or send in an email.
 Ink Art: a painting application developed by Ambient Design originally as ArtRage, licensed to Microsoft for release to Tablet PC users.
 Ink Crossword: a crossword application developed to mirror the experience of a paper crossword puzzle on a tablet PC.
 Media Transfer: a synchronization utility designed to download music, pictures, and videos from computers in the same network.

Education Pack
 Ink Flash Cards: an application designed to assist memorization by using a flashcard approach, enabling the user to hand write their own flash cards and display them back in a slide show.
 Equation Writer: a recognition tool specializing in converting handwritten mathematical equations to a computer-generated image for pasting into other documents.
 GoBinder Lite: an organization and note-taking application developed by Agilix Labs.
 Hexic Deluxe: a game with a tablet PC specific gesture enabled for easier use with the tablet.

Touch Pack
The Touch Pack for Windows 7 is a free package of games and programs optimized for multitouch input.
 Microsoft Blackboard
 Microsoft Garden Pond
 Microsoft Rebound
 Microsoft Surface Globe
 Microsoft Surface Collage
 Microsoft Surface Lagoon

Application software
 Microsoft Windows Journal
 Microsoft Office OneNote
 Einstein Technologies Tablet Enhancements for Outlook
 FutureWave Smartsketch drawing program published by FutureWave Software
 GO Corporation
 Agilix GoBinder
 Mobilis – Protectis Range
 EverNote
 InkSeine: Prototype Tablet GUI/Interface - Microsoft Research
 Xournal - a Linux notetaking application
 OnSite Companion Construction Software for Tablet PC
 Stardraw Control - room automation, home cinema control system

Microsoft Tablet PCs vs. traditional notebooks
The advantages and disadvantages of tablet PCs are highly subjective measures. What appeals to one user may be exactly what disappoints another. The following are commonly cited opinions of the tablet PC platform:

Advantages 
 Use in environments not conducive to a keyboard and mouse such as lying in bed, standing, or handling with one hand.
 Lighter weight, lower power models can function similarly to dedicated reading devices like the Amazon Kindle.
 Touch environment makes navigation easier than conventional use of keyboard and mouse or touchpad in certain contexts such as image manipulation, or mouse oriented games.
 Digital painting and image editing is enhanced and more realistic than painting or sketching with a mouse.
 The ability for easier or faster entering of diagrams, mathematical notations, and symbols.
 Allows, with the proper software, universal input, independent from different keyboard localizations.
 Some users find it more natural and fun to use a stylus to click on objects rather than a finger, mouse or touchpad, which are not directly connected to the pointer on screen.
 Use in entertainment for all media.

Disadvantages 
 Higher cost — convertible tablet PCs can cost significantly more than their non-tablet counterparts (laptops) although this premium has been predicted to fall.
 Input speed — handwriting can be significantly slower than typing speeds, the latter of which can be as high as 50-150 words per minute; however, Slideit, Swype and other technologies are able to provide alternate, speedier methods of input.
 Screen and hinge damage risk - Tablet PCs are handled more than conventional laptops, yet are built on similar frames; in addition, since their screens also serve as input devices, they run a higher risk of screen damage via impacts and misuse. A convertible tablet PC's screen hinge often must rotate around two axes, unlike a normal laptop screen, subsequently increasing the number of possible mechanical and electrical (digitizer and video cables, embedded Wi-Fi antennas, etc.) failure points.
 Ergonomics - a tablet PC does not provide room for a wrist rest while the screen is folded into slate mode. In addition, the user will need to move their arm constantly while writing.
 Weaker video abilities - Most tablet PCs are equipped with embedded graphics processors instead of discrete graphics cards. In July 2010, the only tablet PC's with  discrete graphics cards were the HP TouchSmart tm2t, and the Gateway M285-E which has the ATI Mobility Radeon HD5450 and X1400 series

Features
In addition to the host of features found on regular laptops, tablet PCs may also possess:

Capacitive contact technology, which can sense fingers on the screen without needing significant pressure for system to recognize an input.
Palm recognition, which prevent inadvertent palms or other contacts from disrupting the pen's input.
Multi-touch abilities, which can recognize multiple simultaneous finger touches, allowing for enhanced manipulation of on-screen objects.

See also

Similar devices
 E-book reader
 Comparison of e-book readers
 Tablet computer
 History of tablet computers
 Comparison of tablet computers
 Microsoft Surface

Related components
 Bluetooth
 High Speed Packet Access (HSPA)
 Solid-state drive (SSD)

References

External links

Comparison table of convertible tablets
Microsoft Center for Research on Pen-Centric Computing
 Notes on the History of Pen-based Computing (YouTube)
 Annotated bibliography of references on Pen and Tablet Computers

 
Personal computers
Tablet computers